Manuel Fernández Juncos (December 11, 1846 – August 18, 1928) was a Spanish-born, Puerto Rican journalist, poet, author and humanitarian who wrote the official lyrics to La Borinqueña, Puerto Rico's official anthem.

Early years
Fernández Juncos was born in Tresmonte, a section of Ribadesella, Asturias, Spain. 
Orphaned at an early age, he arrived in Puerto Rico in 1858 aboard a Spanish vessel. Fernández-Juncos became a Puerto Rican by adopting the island as his country and where he was to spend the rest of his life.

Fernández Juncos met Dr. José Gualberto Padilla, a poet known as "El Caribe" who inspired him towards a literary vocation. He first wrote for El Progreso (Progress), a newspaper founded by José Julián Acosta. He also wrote for the Porvenir and El Clamor del País newspapers. Fernández Juncos founded many newspapers with liberal tendencies. Among them, one was called El Buscapie. It promoted a socialist agenda, including the idea that every child should be entitled to a free education. It quickly became the most widely read Puerto Rican paper of its time. He also founded the Revista Puertorriqueña (The Puerto Rican Magazine).

As a writer, Fernández Juncos studied and wrote about the roots of the Puerto Ricans as a people. Among his most notable works were: Tipos y Caracteres, Libro Cuarto de Lectura, and Canciones Escolares (which he co-wrote with Virgilio Dávila and Braulio Dueño Colon). "El Buscapie" was the only newspaper in the island to criticize the local government. In 1893, he founded the Masonic Lodge Patria No. 61 in San Juan, Puerto Rico. He was also the Lodge's first Worshipful Master.

Political activist
Fernández Juncos joined the Autonomist Party founded by Román Baldorioty de Castro and became its secretary. Shortly after, when Puerto Rico was granted its autonomy from Spain, Fernández Juncos was elected and became the first Secretary of State.  However, in less than a year Puerto Rico was invaded by the United States during the Spanish–American War and its government abolished. He founded the Puerto Rican Red Cross, which continues today to give humanitarian help to those in need.

The Americanization process of Puerto Rico by the invaders included the establishment of English to be used in the local schools and the government. As such it was required that books written in English be used. Fernández Juncos, believed that it would not be beneficial to the common person in Puerto Rico who spoke only Spanish. He thereby took upon himself the task of adopting, translating, and writing the books to be used in the schools. Fernández-Juncos later founded the "Casa Manuel Fernández Juncos" for orphaned children in San Juan.

"La Borinqueña"
Fernández Juncos wrote the current lyrics to "La Borinqueña", which originally was a danza written by Francisco Ramírez in 1860 (sometimes credited to Félix Astol Artés in 1867). The original lyrics to the anthem, written by Lola Rodríguez de Tió in 1868, were deemed by the  public as too subversive for public use. A public contest to provide new lyrics to the tune was held in 1903, with Fernández Juncos as its winner (this explains why the Asturias native is credited for writing the lines "The land of Borinquen / where I was born"). "La Borinqueña" became the official anthem of the Commonwealth of Puerto Rico in 1952.

Official Anthem of the Commonwealth of Puerto Rico — "La Boriqueña"

Legacy
Manuel Fernández Juncos died on August 18, 1928 in San Juan, Puerto Rico. Was buried at the Santa María Magdalena de Pazzis Cemetery In San Juan, Puerto Rico. The government of Puerto Rico has honored his memory by naming three schools in the cities of Mayagüez, Juana Diaz, and Cabo Rojo and a commercial avenue in San Juan after him.

A United States Postal Service Post Office in Santurce, Puerto Rico was named the Fernandez Juncos Post Office.

See also

List of Puerto Ricans

References

External links
 

1846 births
1928 deaths
People from Asturias
Burials at Santa María Magdalena de Pazzis Cemetery
People from Ribadesella
Puerto Rican people of Spanish descent
Puerto Rican composers
Puerto Rican male composers
Puerto Rican journalists
Puerto Rican poets
Puerto Rican male writers
Spanish composers
Spanish male composers
Spanish journalists
20th-century Spanish poets
20th-century Spanish male writers
National anthem writers
American male non-fiction writers